The second government of Mariano Rajoy was formed on 4 November 2016, following the latter's election as Prime Minister of Spain by the Congress of Deputies on 29 October and his swearing-in on 31 October, as a result of the People's Party (PP) emerging as the largest parliamentary force at the 2016 Spanish general election.

The cabinet comprised members of the PP and a number of independents. It was dismissed on 1 June 2018 when a motion of no confidence against Rajoy succeeded, but remained in acting capacity until Pedro Sánchez's government was sworn in.

Investiture

Cabinet changes
The only cabinet change of Rajoy's second government took place on 8 March 2018, when Luis de Guindos stepped down as Minister of Economy, Industry and Competitiveness in order to become Vice President of the European Central Bank. He was succeeded by Román Escolano.

Council of Ministers
The Council of Ministers was structured into the offices for the prime minister, the deputy prime minister, 13 ministries and the post of the spokesperson of the Government.

Departmental structure
Mariano Rajoy's second government was organised into several superior and governing units, whose number, powers and hierarchical structure varied depending on the ministerial department.

Unit/body rank
() Secretary of state
() Undersecretary
() Director-general
() Autonomous agency
() Military & intelligence agency

Notes

References

External links
Governments of Spain 2011–present. Ministers of Mariano Rajoy and Pedro Sánchez. Historia Electoral.com (in Spanish).
The governments of the second period of the People's Party Party (since 2011) (under Felipe VI). Lluís Belenes i Rodríguez History Page (in Spanish).

2016 establishments in Spain
2018 disestablishments in Spain
Cabinets established in 2016
Cabinets disestablished in 2018
Council of Ministers (Spain)